Paw Daw Mu Pagoda is a Buddhist pagoda in Myeik, Tanintharyi Region, Myanmar. The largest pagoda in Myeik, it is a popular tourist attraction. The original stupa was said to have been built in the 6th century BC during the time of Buddha and contains his relics.

King Alaungpaya stumbled upon the ruins of the pagoda in the forest and reformed it in 1931. There have been many restorations of it since then. Stamping lightly on its grounds and making a wish is called "aung myay nin chin".

References 

Pagodas in Myanmar